The Benelli MP 90S is a precision target shooting pistol designed for the 25 metre pistol and 25 metre rapid fire pistol ISSF shooting events. It is manufactured by Benelli Armi SpA of Italy. Available calibers are .22 LR and .32 S&W Long Wadcutter.

The Finnish military shooting team uses the MP90S.

Features
Like all pistols designed for the 25 metre pistol and 25 metre rapid fire pistol events, it has fully adjustable sights, trigger and anatomically shaped grip. It employs a semi-automatic fixed barrel operation using the inertial, blow-back system. The feed is through sequential loading with a 5 or 6-round magazine depending upon the caliber.

The trigger action is single action and completely adjustable. The sights are of a square-section type, with fixed front sight and a rear sight with lateral and vertical adjustment. The sight radius is 218 mm (from rear to front sight).

The MP90S is constructed from tough materials, resistant to wear. The barrel is made of chrome-nickel alloy steel. The breech and bolt are constructed from chrome-molybdenum steel. The trigger guard is made of a special alloy of anodised ergal 55 aluminium, while the trigger mechanism is made from molybdenum chrome-nickel, heat treated and chromed.

Performance
The following table shows the major results achieved by shooters using the Benelli MP90S cal. 22:

See also
 Benelli MP 95E

References

External links
 Official homepage - Italy
 Official homepage - USA
 Jasna Sekarič's website

Benelli semi-automatic pistols
.22 LR pistols